The Brasilia Open (aka Philips Cup Aberto da República) is a defunct men's tennis tournament that was played on the ATP Tour for one year in 1991. The event was held in September in Brasilia, Brazil and was played on outdoor carpet courts set-up on the lawn outside the Congresso Nacional. The prize money for the event was 225,000 and Andrés Gómez won the singles title.

Finals

Singles

Doubles

References

External links
Brasilia Open

ATP Tour
Defunct tennis tournaments in Brazil